Rocky De La Fuente ran a third-party campaign for the presidency of the United States in the 2016 election. De La Fuente had sought the Democratic Party's nomination during their presidential primaries. De La Fuente did not win any delegates to the 2016 Democratic National Convention, but he came in third by total votes received. De La Fuente founded the American Delta Party and ran as its presidential nominee with running mate Michael Steinberg. He was also the presidential nominee of the Reform Party, which had ballot access in Florida, Louisiana, and Mississippi. He received 33,136 votes in the general election, placing him eighth in the popular vote.

Democratic primary campaign

De La Fuente filed his candidacy for President of the United States with the Federal Election Commission as a Democrat. He identified himself as a progressive Democrat. He said that he was inspired to run after becoming dissatisfied with the slate of candidates, especially Donald Trump, whom he accused of alienating large segments of the population. On immigration, De La Fuente supported a path to citizenship and was against the wall proposed by Donald Trump.

De La Fuente subsequently has said that the reason he opted to seek the Democratic nomination, rather than the Republican nomination, is that he hoped that the Democratic primary's smaller field of candidates would make it easier for him to stand out. The Republican party had 17 candidates, more than three times the number of major candidates who sought the Democratic nomination.

Below is a table of the results of primaries in which De La Fuente competed during the Democratic primaries. The total number of votes De La Fuente received can be found in the Votes column. The rank in which De La Fuente came among candidates/ballot options can be found in the Place column.

A. As a write-in.

Polls
De La Fuente was almost entirely excluded from polling for the Democratic Primary. However, he was included in three statewide polls.

Texas Democratic Primary

North Carolina Democratic Primary

New Hampshire Democratic Primary

Third-party general election campaign

American Delta Party

De La Fuente founded the American Delta Party leaving United out of its name as a vehicle to continue his campaign into the general election as a third-party candidate. He was nominated as the party's presidential nominee. His running mate was Michael Steinberg of Florida. On August 8, 2016, De La Fuente was named as the presidential nominee of the Reform Party.

American Delta Party held its national convention on September 1, 2016, in Chester Springs, Pennsylvania, and nominated Rocky De La Fuente to run in the United States presidential election representing his party. De La Fuente chose Michael Steinberg as his running mate.

Qualifications
De La Fuente gained ballot access to 147 electoral votes in 20 states (Alaska, Colorado, Florida, Idaho, Iowa, Kentucky, Minnesota, Mississippi, Montana, Nevada, New Hampshire, New Jersey, New Mexico, North Dakota, Rhode Island, Tennessee, Utah, Vermont, Wisconsin, and Wyoming). He qualified as a write-in candidate in Arizona, California, Delaware, Indiana, Maryland, Nebraska, New York, Washington, and West Virginia.

Debates and forums
During his campaign for Democratic nomination, De La Fuente was not invited to any of the Democratic Party forums and debates. De La Fuente also did not qualify for any of the presidential debates sponsored by the Commission on Presidential Debates. De La Fuente, however, was invited to and participated in the 2016 Free & Equal Elections debate.

After coming in fourth and winning no delegates in the 2016 Democratic Party presidential primaries and after founding the American Delta Party as a vehicle to run for president of the United States with his running mate Michael Steinberg and as he lacked ballot access to the larger states, on October 25, 2016, he participated in a debate hosted by the Free & Equal Elections Foundation and debated against the Constitution Party candidate Darrell Castle and the Party for Socialism and Liberation candidate Gloria LaRiva.

Polls

De La Fuente's general election campaign was included in very few polls.

Nevada - Five-way race

Election results
De La Fuente received 33,136 votes in the general election, earning him 0.02% of the total popular vote. He failed to win any electoral votes. In the popular vote De La Fuente placed eighth overall, behind the Democratic Party's Hillary Clinton, Republican Party's Donald Trump, Libertarian Party's Gary Johnson, Green Party's Jill Stein, independent Evan McMullin, Constitution Party's Darrell Castle, and Party for Socialism and Liberation's Gloria La Riva.

De La Fuente received more votes than any Reform Party presidential nominee since Ralph Nader's 2004 campaign.

Recount effort

On November 30 (in response to Green Party presidential nominee Jill Stein's efforts to request recounts in Wisconsin and several other states which Donald Trump won) De La Fuente requested a partial-recount in Nevada (a state which Hillary Clinton won). He considered this effort to be a "counterbalance" at Stein's efforts. De La Fuente paid the $14,000 that was required for him to request for a recount to be held in a sample from 5% of state-precincts. Nevada's partial-recount was completed December 8, finding no significant discrepancies.

Campaign finances
Detailed below are the financial statements filled with the Federal Elections Commission (FEC) of Rocky 2016 LLC as of  November 28, 2016.

Endorsements

Activists
 Deez Nuts
 Brian Moore

References

External links

Rocky 2016 campaign website

Columnist Dave Barry on meeting De La Fuente

De La Fuente, Rocky
De La Fuente, Rocky
2016 United States presidential campaigns